Pavla Benýrová (born 29 September 1989) is a former Czech football midfielder.

External links 
 

1989 births
Living people
Czech women's footballers
Czech Republic women's international footballers
SK Slavia Praha (women) players
Women's association football midfielders
Sportspeople from Plzeň
Czech Women's First League players